is the first anime TV series based on Fujiko F. Fujio's manga of the same name. It was produced by Nippon TeleMovie Productions. It aired from April 1, 1973, to September 30, 1973. After the anime ended, Doraemon remained exclusively a manga until 1979 when Shin-Ei Animation produced a more successful second anime adaptation, which officially ended in 2005; it was in turn replaced by a third anime adaptation shortly after which continues to air to recent days. The series is now considered as a piece of lost media due to its rarity and obscurity. Of the 52 segments, only 21 are known to survive.

Cast and characters

The voice cast was determined in cooperation with Aoni Production and Theatre Echo
Kōsei Tomita and Masako Nozawa as Doraemon
Masako Nozawa as Doraemon, Botako
Yoshiko Ohta as Nobita Nobi
Masako Ebisu as Shizuka Minamoto
Shun Yashiro as Suneo Honekawa
Kaneta Kimotsuki as Takeshi "Gian" Goda
Noriko Ohara as Tamako Nobi
Ichirō Murakoshi as Nobisuke Nobi
Kazue Takahashi as Mrs. Honekawa
Toshiya Ueda as Mrs. Honekawa
Sanji Hase as Mr. Honekawa
Osamu Katou as Mr. Honekawa, Sensei
Masayuki Tatekabe as Sasuke Goda
Keiko Yokoyama as Mrs. Minamoto
Shinichi Kimotsuki as Yoshio Minamoto
Keiko Yamamoto as Sewashi Nobi
Sachiko Chijimatsu as Sewashi Nobi
Masashi Amenomori as Sensei
Keiko Yokozawa as Pregnant Mii-chan
Junko Hori as Gachako
Noriko Tsukase as Damako
Rihoko Yoshida as Jamako

Production and broadcast
The series was broadcast between May 25 to September 30, 1973, on Nippon Television. 26 episodes, divided into 52 individual segments were produced. A pilot film was produced in 1972 and shown to test audiences in January 1973. Audience included Doraemon creator Fujiko F. Fujio. They initially approved of the show, but when they were shown the progress, they apparently were angered by the fact that they changed Nobita and Doraemon's personalities. The show was frequently rebroadcast throughout the 1970s. The station, Toyama Television, was the last to air the show, airing from July 3 to July 24, 1981, and briefly again in August of that year. The station aired the show in individual segments. On August 3, the publisher of the Doraemon manga requested the station to cease airing the show, to make sure the reputation of the more famous and longer running 1979 series isn't harmed. The animation crew of the show, Nippon TeleMovie Productions, went bankrupt in 1981. Before they went defunct, they tried covering debt by selling off the masters of the 1973 series, and destroying cels and storyboards in a kerosene fire. In 1995, the Japanese post-production company IMAGICA, discovered episodes 18 and 20 through 26 in their archive, as well as segments 5A, 10B and 12B.

In 2003, the production chief of the show, Hiroshi Shimozaki, now going under the name Masami Jun or "mcsammy", came forward with several episodes and rush reels (raw footage). He later uploaded low quality versions of the intro and credits to his site on a members only and password protected page, however, a few minutes after the upload, he was told that the intro and credits were uploaded to Japanese anonymous board site 2channel. He immediately removed the video files from his site, but it was already too late. Many images of his episodes were uploaded to GeoCities. In the late 1990s, a person came forward with a VHS recording of the episode "Crazy Stomach Clock", dated from 1978. Audio clips were uploaded, but the site they were hosted on was removed. In 2015, a YouTube user discovered a clip playing on a television set in a Japanese pornographic film from the 1970s.

It is nearly impossible to find info on this version of Doraemon. No episodes exist online, or on home media besides an audio recording of the final episode. The only footage currently available is Jun's uploads of the opening and ending. However, the footage is of very low quality (240p 193kbit/s video, 128kbit/s audio).

Episode list

References

External links
 
 Doraemon (1973 TV series) Design Works
 

Doraemon (anime)
1973 anime television series debuts
Japanese children's animated comedy television series
Japanese adult animated comedy television series
Lost television shows
Nippon TV original programming